The Southwold Sailors' Reading Room is a Grade II listed building on the seafront at Southwold, England. It was built in 1864 as a place for fishermen and mariners to read, as an alternative to drinking in pubs, and also to encourage the pursuit of Christian ideals.

The room has a number of historic displays of model boats and other maritime objects in glass cabinets.

Notes

External links

Southwold Sailors' Reading Room at Trip Advisor Retrieved July 2018
Official Website Retrieved 7 October 2020

Grade II listed buildings in Suffolk
Museums in Suffolk
Southwold